Soroush Omoumi (born 1988 in Tehran), is an Iranian flutist, drummer, percussionist, arranger, and composer.

Biography and career 
Soroush Omoumi was born on 7 February 1988 in Tehran. Since his father was an aspiring musician, Soroush got interested in music as a child, beginning with drums and percussion. Being talented in rhythm and music in general, Soroush spent his childhood learning how to play instruments, mostly self-taught and occasionally helped by his father.

Encouraged by his family, he entered Tehran Music School at the age of twelve, where the flute was assigned his specialized instrument, and he began learning how to play it under the instruction of Mohammad-Ali Legha.

Being instructed by the Music School's masters for six years, Soroush proved one of the best players, finishing the first several times in competitions. He took part in several contests and festivals, including Fajr International Music Festival, National Festival of Youth Music, and Municipality Music Festival, often getting first or second places.

Also keenly interested in playing instruments other than the flute, while studying at the Music School, Soroush took lessons in playing drums under the instruction of Houman Ghaffari, a famous player. Soroush taught himself in playing percussion, saxophone, piccolo, whistle, and recorder too. Towards graduating from the Music School, Soroush started working with various music groups and orchestras (classical, pop, rock, etc.).

After getting a diploma in music, he worked more professionally with more excellent groups and more professional players while teaching music.
Having done his military service, he entered Music University while continuing his professional activities.

Soroush has played in numerous concerts around Iran and a few other countries.

After graduating from the University of Applied Science and Technology in Iran, in 2011 he went to London to continue his studies and was accepted into Middlesex University. There he attended various classes and workshops held by internationally renowned figures of music.

Artistic collaborations 
As an instrument player and arranger, Soroush Omoumi has collaborated with different world music groups and performed at various music events.

He has worked with singers and musicians such as Aref Arefkia, Faramarz Asef, Mehran Atash, Sami Beigi, Googoosh, Hengameh, Rana Mansour, Ayda Mosharraf, Babak Saeedi, Sattar, Shahram Shabpareh, Shakila, Shahyad, and many others.

Soroush also has collaborated with music bands such as Ajam, Nioush, Danoub, Zarbofoot, Tehran Wind Orchestra, Tehran Symphony Orchestra, and Alborz Symphonic Orchestra.

Discography

Instrumental album 
He produced his first instrumental album under the title of 18 in 2018 and released it in early 2019. The album is including 9 tracks as follow: "Avalanche", "Fate", "Alfie's Theme", "Four Seasons", "Dance of Wind", "A Spanish Love Song", "Annie's Song", "Le Basque", and "Imagine".

Collaboratings 
Soroush also has collaborated in producing some other musicians' albums and tracks as composer, arranger, flutist, drummer, and/or percussionist.

Albums

Singles

Turkish singles

References

External links 
 Official website

1988 births
Living people
Iranian composers
Persian musicians
People from Tehran